The 2019 Libéma Open was a tennis tournament played on outdoor grass courts. It was the 30th edition of the event, and part of the 250 Series of the 2019 ATP Tour, and of the WTA International tournaments of the 2019 WTA Tour. Both the men's and the women's events took place at the Autotron park in Rosmalen, 's-Hertogenbosch in the Netherlands, from June 10 through June 16, 2019.

ATP singles main-draw entrants

Seeds

1 Rankings are as of May 27, 2019.

Other entrants
The following players received wildcards into the main draw:
  Borna Ćorić
  Thiemo de Bakker
  Jurij Rodionov

The following players received entry from the qualifying draw:
  Salvatore Caruso
  Alejandro Davidovich Fokina
  Tommy Paul
  Jannik Sinner

The following player received entry as a lucky loser:
  Thomas Fabbiano

Withdrawals
Before the tournament
  Radu Albot → replaced by  Ugo Humbert
  Jérémy Chardy → replaced by  Thomas Fabbiano
  Grigor Dimitrov → replaced by  Lorenzo Sonego
  Damir Džumhur → replaced by  Nicolás Jarry
  Mackenzie McDonald → replaced by  Aljaž Bedene

ATP doubles main-draw entrants

Seeds

1 Rankings are as of May 27, 2019.

Other entrants
The following pairs received wildcards into the doubles main draw:
  Thiemo de Bakker /  David Pel
  Lleyton Hewitt /  Jordan Thompson

The following pair received entry as alternates:
  Andreas Seppi /  João Sousa

Withdrawals
Before the tournament
  Jérémy Chardy

WTA singles main-draw entrants

Seeds

 1 Rankings are as of May 27, 2019.

Other entrants
The following players received wildcards into the main draw:
  Destanee Aiava
  Arantxa Rus
  Bibiane Schoofs

The following players received entry from the qualifying draw:
  Paula Badosa
  Ysaline Bonaventure
  Priscilla Hon
  Varvara Lepchenko
  Greet Minnen
  Elena Rybakina

The following players received entry as lucky losers:
  Fiona Ferro
  Anna Kalinskaya
  Christina McHale

Withdrawals
Before the tournament
  Amanda Anisimova → replaced by  Anna Kalinskaya
  Belinda Bencic → replaced by  Kristýna Plíšková
  Danielle Collins → replaced by  Karolína Muchová
  Petra Martić → replaced by  Christina McHale
  Jeļena Ostapenko → replaced by  Johanna Larsson
  Andrea Petkovic → replaced by  Mona Barthel
  Zheng Saisai → replaced by  Fiona Ferro

WTA doubles main-draw entrants

Seeds

1 Rankings are as of May 27, 2019.

Other entrants
The following pairs received wildcards into the doubles main draw:
  Lesley Kerkhove /  Bibiane Schoofs
  Michaëlla Krajicek /  Arantxa Rus

Champions

Men's singles

  Adrian Mannarino def.  Jordan Thompson, 7–6(9–7), 6–3

Women's singles

  Alison Riske def.  Kiki Bertens, 0–6, 7–6(7–3), 7–5

Men's doubles

  Dominic Inglot /  Austin Krajicek def.  Marcus Daniell /  Wesley Koolhof, 6–4, 4–6, [10–4]

Women's doubles

  Shuko Aoyama /  Aleksandra Krunić def.  Lesley Kerkhove /  Bibiane Schoofs, 7–5, 6–3

References

External links 
 

Libéma Open
Libéma Open
Libéma Open
Libéma Open
Libéma Open